"Je danse dans ma tête" (meaning "I Dance Inside My Head") is a song by Canadian singer Celine Dion, recorded for her French-language album, Dion chante Plamondon (1991). In March 1992, it was released as the third single in Canada and first in France, where the album was renamed Des mots qui sonnent and issued in April 1992. The song was written by French-Canadian lyricist Luc Plamondon and Italian composer Romano Musumarra, and produced by Musumarra. "Je danse dans ma tête" reached number three on the chart in Quebec and the music video, directed by Alain DesRochers, won the Much Music Video Award for Best Adult Contemporary Video in 1992. The song was included on Dion's greatest hits album, On ne change pas (2005).

Background and release
"Je danse dans ma tête" was written by French-Canadian lyricist Luc Plamondon and Italian composer Romano Musumarra, and produced by Musumarra. It is one of four new songs written for the album Dion chante Plamondon, which was released in Canada in November 1991. "Je danse dans ma tête" was selected as the third Canadian single, after "Des mots qui sonnent" and "L'amour existe encore", and released in March 1992. The same month, "Je danse dans ma tête" was issued as the lead single in France, where the album was renamed Des mots qui sonnent and released in April 1992. The commercial single included other songs from the album, "Un garçon pas comme les autres (Ziggy)" and "Les uns contre les autres", and the promotional single featured two remixes of "Je danse dans ma tête": Europe Mix and Club Europe Mix.

Critical response
According to Music & Media magazine, Dion took an unexpected turn towards dance in "Je danse dans ma tête", but she sounds confident in her new role. They wrote that the chorus with the word "danse" sung in a deliberate stuttering voice is one of the funniest gimmicks of late.

Chart performance
"Je danse dans ma tête" entered the Quebec Airplay Chart on 23 March 1992 and peaked at number three. The song stayed on the chart for fourteen weeks. However, it did not make much impact on the charts in France.

Music video
The music video was directed by Alain DesRochers in April 1992. It won the Much Music Video Award for Best Adult Contemporary Video in 1992. In 2005, the music video for "Je danse dans ma tête" was included on Dion's DVD, On ne change pas.

Live performances
On 5 April 1992, Dion performed "Je danse dans ma tête" during TV special Salut à Luc Plamondon in Quebec, Canada. On 18 May 1992, she sang it during TV show Stars 90 in France. Dion also performed "Je danse dans ma tête" during other Canadian TV shows: Last Friday Night and Sonia Benzera Special Dimanche. She also sang it during her Celine Dion in Concert tour in 1992 and 1993. Live versions of "Je danse dans ma tête" can be found on Dion's 1994 album, À l'Olympia and her 2013 CD/DVD, Céline une seule fois / Live 2013.

Track listings and formats
French 3", 7", cassette single
"Je danse dans ma tête" – 4:13
"Un garçon pas comme les autres (Ziggy)" – 2:56

French CD single
"Je danse dans ma tête" – 4:13
"Un Garçon Pas Comme Les Autres (Ziggy)" – 2:56
"Les uns contre les autres" – 3:09

Canadian/French promotional CD single
"Je danse dans ma tête" (Original Version) – 4:13
"Je danse dans ma tête" (Europe Mix Version) – 4:35
"Je danse dans ma tête" (Europe Mix Club Version) – 6:32

Charts

References

1991 songs
1992 singles
Celine Dion songs
Columbia Records singles
Epic Records singles
French-language songs
Songs with lyrics by Luc Plamondon
Songs about dancing
Songs written by Romano Musumarra